Responsibility may refer to:

 Collective responsibility
 Corporate social responsibility
 Duty
 Legal liability
 Legal obligation
 Legal responsibility (disambiguation)
 Media responsibility 
 Moral responsibility, or personal responsibility
 Obligation
 Professional responsibility 
 Responsibility assumption, a doctrine in existential psychotherapy
 Social responsibility
 Responsibility for the Holocaust
 The Westminster system constitutional conventions of:
 Cabinet collective responsibility
 Individual ministerial responsibility

As a proper name
 Responsibility (novel), by Nigel Cox
 "Responsibility" (song), by punk band MxPx

See also

 
 
 
 Accountability
 Blame
 Moral hazard

Sociological terminology
Virtue